Performance Evaluation is an international journal published by Elsevier.  The current Editor-in-chief is B. Van Houdt. The journal was previously published by North-Holland Publisher.

Editors

 1981–1986: Hisashi Kobayashi
 1987–1990: Martin Reiser
 1991–2007: Werner Bux
 2008– 2017: Philippe Nain

Computer science journals
Publications established in 1981
Elsevier academic journals
English-language journals
Monthly journals